Pyeongtaek Im clan is one of the Korean clans. Their Bon-gwan is in Pyeongtaek, Gyeonggi Province. According to the research held in 2015, the number of Pyeongtaek Im clan's member was 225872. Their founder was  who was a Hanlin Academy in Tang dynasty. He was naturalized in Silla as one of the Eight Scholars in Tang dynasty.

Notable people 
 Im Nayeon
 Lim Na-young
 Nana (entertainer)

See also 
 Korean clan names of foreign origin

References

External links 
 

 
Korean clan names of Chinese origin
Im clans